Evenor (Ancient Greek:  or Εὐήνορα Euenor means 'joy of men') is the name of a character from the myth of Atlantis and of several historical figures.

Mythological

 Evenor, father of Cleito by Leucippe.
Evenor, the "brazen-tasleted" Achaean warrior who participated in the Trojan War. He was from Dulichium and was slain by Paris during the siege of Troy.
Evenor, a Trojan soldier who was killed by Neoptolemus during the Trojan War. The latter smote Evenor above the flank and drove the spear into his liver which resulted to his swift anguished death.
Evenor, father of Leocritus and possibly, of Evenorides, both were Suitors of Penelope. 

Historical

 Evenor, a Greek painter who flourished around 420 BC, the father and teacher of the better-known painter Parrhasius of Ephesus. 
 Evenor, a Greek surgeon and medical author who lived in or before the 3rd century BC and apparently wrote about fractures and joint dislocations; if he is the same as an Evenor quoted by Pliny the Elder, he also wrote about the medicinal properties of plants.

Notes

References 

 Apollodorus, The Library with an English Translation by Sir James George Frazer, F.B.A., F.R.S. in 2 Volumes, Cambridge, MA, Harvard University Press; London, William Heinemann Ltd. 1921. ISBN 0-674-99135-4. Online version at the Perseus Digital Library. Greek text available from the same website.
Homer, The Odyssey with an English Translation by A.T. Murray, PH.D. in two volumes. Cambridge, MA., Harvard University Press; London, William Heinemann, Ltd. 1919. . Online version at the Perseus Digital Library. Greek text available from the same website.
 Pliny the Elder, The Natural History. John Bostock, M.D., F.R.S. H.T. Riley, Esq., B.A. London. Taylor and Francis, Red Lion Court, Fleet Street. 1855. Online version at the Perseus Digital Library.
 Pliny the Elder, Naturalis Historia. Karl Friedrich Theodor Mayhoff. Lipsiae. Teubner. 1906. Latin text available at the Perseus Digital Library.
 Quintus Smyrnaeus, The Fall of Troy translated by Way. A. S. Loeb Classical Library Volume 19. London: William Heinemann, 1913. Online version at theoi.com
 Quintus Smyrnaeus, The Fall of Troy. Arthur S. Way. London: William Heinemann; New York: G.P. Putnam's Sons. 1913. Greek text available at the Perseus Digital Library.

Achaeans (Homer)
Characters in the Odyssey
3rd-century BC Greek physicians
Ancient Greek writers known only from secondary sources